Machines Against the Rage is a live album released by Australian alternative rock band TISM. The album was initially released as a bonus CD with limited edition re-issues of Machiavelli and the Four Seasons, and was also released as a promotional CD with a bonus copy of the "All Homeboys are Dickheads" single. The album peaked at number 87 on the ARIA Charts in February 1997.

The title is a re-wording of the name of the protest rock group Rage Against the Machine, who were nearing the height of their popularity at the time of this release.

On 25 November 2022, a double-vinyl reissue was released, featuring 4 songs and a spoken-word poem from the original concerts that were excised from the original CD release.

Track listing

Charts

Release history

References

1996 live albums
Live albums by Australian artists
TISM albums